Aerodramus is a genus of small, dark, cave-nesting birds in the Collocaliini tribe of the swift family. Its members are confined to tropical and subtropical regions in southern Asia, Oceania and northeastern Australia. Many of its members were formerly classified in Collocalia, but were first placed in a separate genus by American ornithologist Harry Church Oberholser in 1906.

This is a taxonomically difficult group of very similar species. Echolocation, DNA sequencing and parasitic lice have all been used to establish relationships, but some problems, such as the placement of the Papuan swiftlet are not fully resolved. These swiftlets can pose major identification problems where several species occur.

What distinguishes Aerodramus swiftlets from other swifts, and indeed almost all other birds, is their ability to use a simple but effective form of echolocation. This enables them to navigate within the breeding and roosting caves.

The nests of Aerodramus swiftlets are constructed with saliva as a major component. In two species, saliva is the only  material used, and the nests are collected for the famous Chinese delicacy 'bird's nest soup', the over-collection of which puts pressure on the swiftlet populations.

Distribution
The range of these swiftlets is confined to tropical southern Asia, Oceania, northeastern Australia and the Indian Ocean, with the greatest diversity in Southeast Asia, Indonesia and Papua New Guinea. Several of the species are restricted to small islands, and their limited range can make them vulnerable, like the Seychelles, Whitehead's and  Guam swiftlets. The Mangaia swiftlet is a recently extinct species known only from fossils.

Description

Aerodramus swiftlets are in many respects typical swifts, having narrow wings for fast flight, and a wide gape and small reduced beak surrounded by bristles for catching insects in flight. They have dull plumage which is mainly in shades of black, brown, and grey. Members of this genus typically have dark brown upper wings and upper body, sometimes with a paler rump, light brown underparts, a paler throat, and brownish-white under-wings with dark brown "armpits". Males and female plumages are similar in appearance, as is that of the juvenile, for those species for which it has been described; in some species the juvenile shows pale fringes  to the flight feathers.

The legs, as with many swifts, are very short, preventing the birds from perching, but allowing them to cling to vertical surfaces. The flight is mainly gliding due to very long primary feathers and small breast muscles.  Aerodramus swiftlets, depending on species, weigh 8–35 grammes (0.28–1.23 oz) and are 9–16 centimetres (0.28–1.23 in) long. These swiftlets are very similar, and where several species occur, such as Borneo, New Guinea and the Philippines, may not be separable in the field.

Behaviour

Aerodramus swiftlets are aerial insectivores, which take prey like flies on the wing.  They roost and breed in caves; during the day they leave the caves to forage for food, and return to  roost at night. They are monogamous and both partners take part in caring for the nestlings.  Males perform aerial displays to attract females and mating occurs at the nest.  The breeding season overlaps the wet season, which corresponds to an increased insect population.

Clutch size depends on the location and the food source, but generally Aerodramus swiftlets lay one or two eggs. The eggs are a dull white, and are laid every other day. Many, if not all, species are colonial nesters; some build their nests in high, dark corners on cave walls.

Most Aerodramus swiftlets live in the tropical Indo-Pacific region and do not migrate.  These birds usually remain in one cave or other roosting/nesting site.  Examples of cave sites include the Niah Caves  and Gunung Mulu National Park, which are both located in Sarawak, Malaysian Borneo.

Characteristics of behaviour, such as what materials apart from saliva the nests contain, can be used to differentiate between certain species of Aerodramus.

Echolocation

The genus Aerodramus is of special interest due to its use of echolocation. The swiftlets use this technique to navigate in  darkness through the chasms and shafts of the caves where they breed and roost at night. Apart from swiftlets, the only other avian species to use echolocation is the unrelated oilbird.

The Aerodramus swiftlets' echolocating double clicks are within the normal human hearing range and up to 3 milliseconds apart, with the interval becoming shorter in darker locations. Unlike the rest of the genus (for those species which have been studied), the Atiu swiftlet, Aerodramus sawtelli, and the black-nest swiftlet, A. maximus, emit only single clicks.  The former species also uses echolocation outside its caves.

The use of echolocation was once used to separate Aerodramus from the other non-echolocating cave swiftlet genera Collocalia and Hydrochous (virtually nothing is known about Schoutedenapus). However, recently, the pygmy swiftlet, Collocalia troglodytes, was discovered making similar clicking noises both inside and outside its roosting cave.

It has recently been determined that the echolocation vocalizations do not agree with evolutionary relationship between swiftlet species as suggested by DNA sequence comparison. This suggests that as in bats, echolocation sounds, once present, adapt rapidly and independently to the particular species' acoustic environment.

A study suggested that the echolocation subunits were mainly located in the central nervous system, while the subunits in the vocal apparatus were already present and capable of use before echolocation even evolved.  This study supports the  hypothesis of independent evolution of echolocation in Aerodramus and Collocalia, with the subsequent evolution of complex behaviour needed to complement the physical echolocation system, or just possibly that the vocal apparatus-parts of the echolocation system might even be inherited from some prehistoric nocturnal ancestor.

It has been suggested that the giant or waterfall swiftlet, Hydrochous gigas, which cannot echolocate, may be descended from an echolocating ancestor.

Saliva nests

The intricately constructed saliva nests of this swiftlet genus, which in some species contain no other material, are collected to make the delicacy bird's nest soup. They therefore command extremely high prices.

Authentic bird's nest soup is made from the nests of the edible-nest swiftlet (or white-nest swiftlet), Aerodramus fuciphagus, and the black-nest swiftlet, Aerodramus maximus. Instead of incorporating twigs, feathers and straw like others in the genus, these two swiftlets make their nest only from strands of their gummy saliva, which harden when exposed to air. Once the nests are harvested, they are cleaned and sold to restaurants. Over the past twenty years, the high demand for the nests of these Aerodramus species has had an adverse effect on their populations. The Niah caves population of black-nest swiftlets plunged from around 1.5 million pairs in 1959 to 150,000–298,000 pairs in the early 1990s through over-harvesting.

Early authors had doubts about the material used to make the nest, with whale and fish sperm and sea foam being proposed as the basis for construction.  Even in the 1830s, when the use of saliva had been fairly well established, it was believed that it was only a cement to bind a sea plant which provided the bulk of the gelatinous material of the nest.

Lice
As with other taxonomically difficult groups, ectoparasites can give information on relationships. A study of swiftlet parasites in northern Borneo involved transferring lice between  closely related swiftlet species. The survival of lice in most of these transfers was significantly reduced in proportion to the mean difference in feather barb size between the donor and recipient species of hosts. Thus, adaptation to a particular resource on the body of the host appears to govern the specificity of swiftlet lice. In transfers where lice survived, the lice moved to different areas on the body of the host where the mean barb diameter of the feathers on which the lice occurred had the required value.

Papuan swiftlet
The Papuan swiftlet, Aerodramus papuensis, has three toes instead of the usual four in this group. It has the ability to echolocate, but whereas other previously studied species use echolocation primarily while flying in their caves, the Papuan swiftlet appears to be nocturnal or crepuscular and uses echolocation while active outside at night. It uses single, not double, clicks. DNA sequence data provides strong support for a basal relationship between A. papuensis and other Aerodramus taxa and suggest that this species and the waterfall swift Hydrochous gigas, are sister taxa, a relationship that would indicate paraphyly of the genus Aerodramus.

Taxonomy 
The genus Aerodramus was introduced (as a subgenus of Collocalia) in 1906 by the American ornithologist Harry C. Oberholser. He designated the type species as Collocalia innominata Hume. This taxon is now considered as a subspecies of the Himalayan swiftlet (Aerodramus brevirostris). The genus name combines the Ancient Greek aēr meaning "air" with -dromos meaning
"-racer" (from trekhō "to run").

The genus now contains 28 species:
 
 Seychelles swiftlet, Aerodramus elaphrus – split from Halmahera swiftlet
 Mascarene swiftlet, Aerodramus francicus
 Indian swiftlet, Aerodramus unicolor
 Philippine swiftlet, Aerodramus mearnsi
 Halmahera swiftlet, Aerodramus infuscatus
 Sulawesi swiftlet, Aerodramus sororum
 Seram swiftlet, Aerodramus ceramensis
 Mountain swiftlet, Aerodramus hirundinaceus
 White-rumped swiftlet, Aerodramus spodiopygius
 Australian swiftlet, Aerodramus terraereginae
 Himalayan swiftlet, Aerodramus brevirostris – includes Indochinese swiftlet (A. b. rogersi)
 Volcano swiftlet, Aerodramus vulcanorum 
 Whitehead's swiftlet, Aerodramus whiteheadi
 Bare-legged swiftlet, Aerodramus nuditarsus
 Mayr's swiftlet, Aerodramus orientalis
 Mossy-nest swiftlet, Aerodramus salangana
 Uniform swiftlet, Aerodramus vanikorensis
 Ameline swiftlet, Aerodramus amelis – split from uniform swiftlet, includes Palawan swiftlet (A. a. palawanensis)
 Palau swiftlet, Aerodramus pelewensis
 Mariana swiftlet, Aerodramus bartschi
 Island swiftlet, Aerodramus inquietus
 Tahiti swiftlet, Aerodramus leucophaeus
 Atiu swiftlet, Aerodramus sawtelli
 Marquesan swiftlet, Aerodramus ocistus
 Black-nest swiftlet, Aerodramus maximus
 Edible-nest swiftlet, Aerodramus fuciphagus – includes brown-rumped swiftlet (A. f. vestitus)
 Germain's swiftlet, Aerodramus germani
 Three-toed swiftlet, Aerodramus papuensis

There is also an extinct species known from fossils:
Mangaia swiftlet, Aerodramus manuoi (prehistoric extinction)

Fossil species
A right ulna (MNZ S42799) found at the Bannockburn Formation of the Manuherikia Group near the Manuherikia River in Otago, New Zealand. Dating from the Early to Middle Miocene (Altonian, 19-16 million years ago), probably belongs to Aerodramus.

References

External links

 
Bird genera
Cave birds
Animals that use echolocation
Taxa named by Harry C. Oberholser